Calamaria septentrionalis is a species of snake of the family Colubridae. It is commonly known as the Hong Kong dwarf snake.

Geographic range
The snake is found in China and Vietnam.

References 

Reptiles described in 1890
Reptiles of China
Reptiles of Vietnam
Colubrids
Calamaria
Snakes of China
Snakes of Vietnam
Snakes of Asia